Stanwick Hall is a largely Georgian grade II* listed building located in the western end of the village of Stanwick in North Northamptonshire.

History
The house was originally constructed in the C17, possibly earlier. Evidence of this original building is scant but survives:

 The cellars/basement predate the house constructed above, the south elevation of which features a pair of dateable C17 3 light stone mullion windows
 This is cooberated by a Victorian pencil sketch, which depicts a central doorway into the cellar / basement of the same era as the extant mullion windows either side (doorway now blocked, with no external trace visible)
 A 1722 "notice to lett" for the original house  offers few clues to the form of the original building,  other than "four rooms on a floor", which interestingly, is carried over into the current building, described exactly as such in 1802. This is most likely a coincidence, but may hint at extensive remodelling (where internal walls were retained,) rather than demolition and a complete 1740s basement-up new build. The 1722 description of the rest of the property is broadly similar to later for sale or to let notices - Barns, Stables, Brewhouse and Dovehouse, good Garden planted with Wall Fruit, and a Cherry Orchard well planted, of about 6 Acres. Also about 24 Acres of other inclos'd Land, all adjoining to the said House.
The presence of full-height C17 panelling with frieze decorated with scrolls in the central first floor room  would also appear to be a significant, dateable remaining feature of the original house. However, as is explained below, the house suffered a major fire on April 2, 1931, with only the bare walls remaining. Either the effects of the fire were exaggerated & the paneling is a remnant of the original house, or it was taken from another building and fitted during the rebuild following the fire, or even during the 1740s construction phase.

The Hall as it appears today was built in 1742-1743 for James Lambe (d.1761) by William Smith (1705-1747) at a cost of £750 (about £150,000 in modern terms.)

William Smith was an acclaimed Architect and Builder and was the son of Francis Smith of Warwick.  William Smith was involved as architect, builder or mason in many major projects, including the Radcliffe Camera, Catton Hall, Kirtlington Park, Thame Park and Stoneleigh Abbey, on which he worked with his father.  Stoneleigh Abbey was immortalized by Jane Austen in her novel Mansfield Park, in which Stoneleigh Abbey becomes Sotherton Court.

After the death of James Lambe, Stanwick Hall was advertised as for sale on several occasions.  The sale notice showed Stanwick Hall (a modern, stone-built capital mansion), a coach house, two dove houses, two barns, three 3-stall stables, two other stables with convenient outbuildings, a dog kennel and boiling house with constant running water.  It included 30 acres of rich pasture in three closes (Nether Close, Dove House Close and Upper Close, called the Cherry Orchard).  There were 15 acres at Stanwick Pastures, to the east of the village and a further 97 acres of arable, ley and pasture ground in the open fields around the village.

At the time of its reconstruction, Stanwick Hall was adjacent to what was then the main road into Stanwick from the west, which ran between the main house and outbuildings to the immediate north of the house.

In 1931, there was a major fire that started in one of the lower rooms.  The owners escaped and no one was killed but the building was gutted.  The building was placed on the English Heritage "At Risk" Register, with fungus growing on damp walls, roof tiles broken and roof timbers in danger of collapsing at any moment.

The building was purchased in 2007. A major restoration project started by the new owners was the subject of a BBC Restoration Home programme in 2011.

Occupants
Known occupants of Stanwick Hall include:
 Pre-1743: Tenants or owners of the previous house on the site of the current Hall currently unknown.
 1743: James Lambe.  Born in Hackney, son of James Lambe, habadasher, James was one of the few individuals who made money from the South Sea Company's Africa-South America slave trading.  He was born in Hackney Middlesex, but his main home became Fairford Park in Gloucestershire, where he was the Lord of the Manor, through marriage to Esther Barker whose family bought Fairford Park in 1650.
 1761 James Lambe dies and shortly afterwards Stanwick Hall is either purchased or let out to a member of the Lambe family of Stanwick and Great Addington Northamptonshire. The relationship between James Lambe and the Great Addington Lambe family is intriguing and yet to be established, but currently appears to be a surname coincidence, with no family links.
 1790 The ownership or tenancy of the Hall passes to William Zouch Lucas Ward of Guilsborough Hall Northamptonshire, (who goes on to be Lord Lieutenant of Northamptonshire) through his marriage to Mary Lambe of the Great Addington / Stanwick Lambes.
 1791: Preferring to live in the grander of his Guilsborough Hall,Guilsborough William Zouch Lucas Ward rents the Hall to Lord Egmont. John Perceval, 3rd Earl of Egmont, (the brother of Spencer Perceval, who remains the only Prime Minister of the United Kingdom to have been assassinated.)
 1820s: George Gascoyen.  Purchase or rents Stanwick Hall, having moved from Little Addington to Stanwick.  Following the Enclosure Acts, George Gascoyen became one of the five major landowners in Stanwick.  After his death in 1841, the land was split between his two sons and Stanwick Hall was eventually sold.
 1870: Cecil Wetenhall.
 1882: Thomas and James Somes.
 1915: Colonel Fawcett.
2006–present: The Russell family.

References

Grade II* listed buildings in Northamptonshire
Houses completed in 1743
1743 establishments in England
North Northamptonshire